Danish Open may refer to:
 Denmark Open a badminton tournament
 Danish Open (golf) a defunct golf tournament
 Danish Open (tennis) a WTA tennis tournament for women